In photometry, illuminance is the total luminous flux incident on a surface, per unit area. It is a measure of how much the incident light illuminates the surface, wavelength-weighted by the luminosity function to correlate with human brightness perception. Similarly, luminous emittance is the luminous flux per unit area emitted from a surface. Luminous emittance is also known as luminous exitance.

In SI units illuminance is measured in lux (lx), or equivalently in lumens per square metre (lm·m−2). Luminous exitance is measured in lm·m−2 only, not lux. The foot-candle is a non-metric unit of illuminance that is used in photography.

Illuminance was formerly often called brightness, but this leads to confusion with other uses of the word, such as to mean luminance. "Brightness" should never be used for quantitative description, but only for nonquantitative references to physiological sensations and perceptions of light.

The human eye is capable of seeing somewhat more than a 2 trillion-fold range.

Common illuminance levels

Astronomy
In astronomy, the illuminance stars cast on the Earth's atmosphere is used as a measure of their brightness. The usual units are apparent magnitudes in the visible band. V-magnitudes can be converted to lux using the formula
,
where Ev is the illuminance in lux, and mv is the apparent magnitude. The reverse conversion is
.

Relation to luminance

The luminance of a reflecting surface is related to the illuminance it receives:

where the integral covers all the directions of emission , and
 v is the surface's luminous exitance
 v is the received illuminance, and
  is the reflectance.

In the case of a perfectly diffuse reflector (also called a Lambertian reflector), the luminance is isotropic, per Lambert's cosine law. Then the relationship is simply

See also
Irradiance
Exposure value
Luminance

References

External links
 Illuminance Converter
 Knowledgedoor, LLC (2005) Library of Units and Constants: Illuminance Quantity
 Kodak's guide to Estimating Luminance and Illuminance using a camera's exposure meter. Also available in PDF form.

Physical quantities
Photometry